The Young Woman Engineer of the Year Awards are presented at the Institution of Engineering and Technology, London, England. Part of the IET Achievement Medals collection, the award was launched in 1978, and was originally known as the Girl Technician of the Year, until renamed in 1988. The award was first sponsored by the Caroline Haslett Memorial Trust, which was formed in 1945. It is now funded and sponsored by the Institution of Engineering and Technology and  Women's Engineering Society. Awarded to young female engineering apprentices in the UK.

Recipients of the Young Woman Engineer of the Year Awards 
 2020 Ella Podmore
 2019 Ying Wan Loh
2018 Sophie Harker
 2017 Ozak Esu
 2016 Jenni Sidey
 2015 Orla Murphy
 2014 Naomi Mitchison
 2013 Abbie Hutty
 2012 Yewande Akinola
 2011 Charlotte Joyce
 2010  Arlene McConnell

Related awards

The Mary George Memorial Prize for Apprentices 

Mary George CBE was the Director and Secretary of the Electrical Association for Women. The prize is given annually to a young woman apprentice.

The winners so far have included:
 2019 Samantha Magowan
2018 Shajida Akthar
 2017 Jamie D’Ath
 2016 Gemma Dalziel
 2015 Emma Goulding
 2014 Jessica Bestwick
 2013 Sara Underwood
 2012 Jessica Jones
 2011 Laurie-Ann Smith

Women’s Engineering Society Prize 

The Women's Engineering Society Prize is awarded to a young woman engineer who demonstrates exceptional talent within engineering alongside a commitment to improving diversity within engineering.

The winners so far have included:
 2022 Eneni Bambara-Abban
 2021 Eftychia Koursari
 2020 Shrouk El-Attar
2019 Dr. Claire Lucas, Associate Professor of Systems and Information Engineering at the University of Warwick
2018 Lorna Bennet
 2017 Larissa Suzuki
 2016 Bethan Murray
 2015 Helen Cavill
 2014 Lucy Ackland
 2013 Yasmin Ali
 2012 Charlotte Tingley
 2011 Kelly Walker
 2009 Farah Azirar
 2008 Bijal Thakore
 2007 Mamta Singhal
 2006 Maire McLoone
 2005 Rachael Johnson
 2004 Claire Woolaghanwon

Gender Diversity Ambassador Award 
The Gender Diversity Ambassador Award was introduced in 2019 to recognise an individual who has worked for much of their career to support gender equality in engineering.

Winners:

 2019 Wing Commander Glynis Dean, Royal Air Force Youth and Diversity Team.

See also

 List of engineering awards

References 

1978 establishments in the United Kingdom
Awards established in 1978
British science and technology awards
Engineering awards
Institution of Engineering and Technology